Frank Norton Harsh Sr. (March 10, 1894 – May 18, 1956) was an American football and basketball coach. He served as the head football coach at Kent State Normal College—now known as Kent State University—from 1923 to 1924, compiling a record of 0–9. Harsh was also the school's head basketball coach from 1923 to 1925, tallying a record of 8–17. He graduated from Ohio State University in 1917

Head coaching record

Football

References

External links
 

1894 births
1956 deaths
Basketball coaches from Ohio
Kent State Golden Flashes football coaches
Kent State Golden Flashes men's basketball coaches
Ohio State University alumni
Sportspeople from Cleveland